Chilbilia, also spelled Chilbiliya is a village in Piro block of Bhojpur district, Bihar, India. It is located southeast of Piro. As of 2011, its population was 966, in 148 households.

References 

Villages in Bhojpur district, India